Judith Chemla (born 5 July 1985) is a French actress.

Life and career
In 2012, Chemla appeared in Camille Rewinds, for which she was nominated for Best Supporting Actress at the 38th César Awards.

On 10 April 2020, during the coronavirus lockdown, Chemla was one of a handful of people to take part in a Good Friday service led by Michel Aupetit, Archbishop of Paris, in the Cathedral of Notre-Dame de Paris, still being rebuilt after being damaged by fire a year earlier. All wore protective clothing. Chemla read, and gave an a capella rendition of Ave Maria.

Filmography

Theater

References

External links

1985 births
Place of birth missing (living people)
French film actresses
21st-century French actresses
Living people
Chevaliers of the Ordre des Arts et des Lettres
Most Promising Actress Lumières Award winners